Workers' Daily (lit. worker's daily) is a simplified Chinese language newspaper nationwide in China with the circulation of 2,200,000. It's the official newspaper of All-China Federation of Trade Unions.

The newspaper has been published since 1946, reporting economic news in China.

References
 Official website
 Source: Pinyin translated with CozyChinese.COM

External links
 

Chinese-language newspapers (Simplified Chinese)
Daily newspapers published in China
Publications established in 1946
Chinese Communist Party newspapers
1946 establishments in China
All-China Federation of Trade Unions